Coxapopha carinata is a species of araneomorphae spider of the family Oonopidae.

Distribution 
The species is endemic to the state of Amazonas in Brazil. It is found in Manaus.

Description 
The male holotype measures 2.0 mm.

Publications 
 Ott & Brescovit, 2004 : "Three new species of the haplogyne spider genus Coxapopha Platnick from the Amazon region (Araneae, Oonopidae)". Revista Ibérica de Aracnología, .

References

External links 
 
 

Oonopidae
Endemic fauna of Brazil
Spiders described in 2004